Santa Luz is a municipality in the state of Piauí in the Northeast region of Brazil.

The municipality contains part of the  Serra das Confusões National Park, created in 1998, which protects an area of the Caatinga biome.

See also
List of municipalities in Piauí

References

Municipalities in Piauí